Edward's massasauga may refer to:

 Sistrurus catenatus edwardsii, also known as the desert massasauga, a venomous snake pitviper subspecies found in the southwestern United States and northern Mexico.
 Sistrurus catenatus tergeminus, also known as the western massasauga, a venomous pitviper subspecies found in the southwestern plains of the United States.